Conrad may refer to:

People 
 Conrad (name)

Places

United States 
 Conrad, Illinois, an unincorporated community
 Conrad, Indiana, an unincorporated community
 Conrad, Iowa, a city
 Conrad, Montana, a city
 Conrad Glacier, Washington

Elsewhere 
 Conrad, Alberta, Canada, a former unincorporated community
 Conrad Mountains, Queen Maud Land, Antarctica
 Mount Conrad, Oates Land, Antarctica
 Mount Conrad (Canada), Purcell Mountains, British Columbia

Businesses 
 Conrad Editora, a Brazilian publisher
 Conrad Electronic, a German retailer
 Conrad Hotels, the global luxury brand of Hilton Hotels
 Conrad Models, a German manufacturer of diecast toys and promotional models

Other uses 
 Conrad (comic strip)
 CONRAD (organization), an American organization which promotes reproductive health in the developing world
 ORP Conrad, name of the cruiser HMS Danae (D44) while loaned to the Polish Navy (1944-1946)

See also 
 Conradi
 Conradin
 Conradines
 Conrads (disambiguation)
 Corrado (disambiguation)
 Conradt (disambiguation)
 Konrad (disambiguation)